Angus Ng Ka Long (born 24 June 1994) is a badminton player from Hong Kong. He has a career-high ranking of 6th in the men's singles discipline. He won the 2016 Hong Kong Super Series, the 2020 Thailand Masters and the  2023 German Open (badminton)

Early life and education 
Ng trained at the Hong Kong Sports Institute. He credits his father as the main influence on his career. His grandmother from his mother's side is Chinese-Indonesian.

Career 
At the 2010 BWF World Junior Championships, Guadalajara, he won a bronze medal in the men's doubles category. He won gold in the men's doubles in 2012 in Chiba Prefecture. He won bronze in the 2012 Asian Junior Championships in men's doubles.

In 2013, Ng participated in the 2013 BWF World Championships in Guangzhou, China, was the runner-up at the Vietnam International Challenge in men's singles, and competed in the 2013 East Asian Games in Tianjin for Hong Kong, winning a silver medal in the men's team and bronze in the men's doubles.

In 2014, Ng won the China International Challenge, Osaka International Challenge and Irish Open. He was the runner-up at the Canadian Grand Prix and the Swiss International tournaments.

In 2015, Ng won the men's singles title at the Austrian Open. He later won his first Grand Prix title at the Bitburger Open.  He also came second at the Canadian Grand Prix and reached the semifinals at the Hong Kong Super Series, having beaten top 10 players like Lin Dan and Chou Tien Chen before losing to the legendary Lee Chong Wei.

In 2016, Ng made history by becoming the first home player to win the men's singles title at the Hong Kong Open, beating India's Sameer Verma in the final. He also competed at the 2016 Summer Olympics.

Achievements

East Asian Games 
Men's doubles

BWF World Junior Championships 
Boys' doubles

Asian Junior Championships 
Boys' doubles

BWF World Tour (2 titles, 6 runners-up) 
The BWF World Tour, which was announced on 19 March 2017 and implemented in 2018, is a series of elite badminton tournaments sanctioned by the Badminton World Federation (BWF). The BWF World Tour is divided into levels of World Tour Finals, Super 1000, Super 750, Super 500, Super 300, and the BWF Tour Super 100.

Men's singles

BWF Superseries (1 title) 
The BWF Superseries, which was launched on 14 December 2006 and implemented in 2007, was a series of elite badminton tournaments, sanctioned by the Badminton World Federation (BWF). BWF Superseries levels were Superseries and Superseries Premier. A season of Superseries consisted of twelve tournaments around the world that had been introduced since 2011. Successful players were invited to the Superseries Finals, which were held at the end of each year.

Men's singles

  BWF Superseries Finals tournament
  BWF Superseries Premier tournament
  BWF Superseries tournament

BWF Grand Prix (2 titles, 2 runners-up) 
The BWF Grand Prix had two levels, the BWF Grand Prix and Grand Prix Gold. It was a series of badminton tournaments sanctioned by the Badminton World Federation (BWF) which was held from 2007 to 2017.

Men’s singles

  BWF Grand Prix Gold tournament
  BWF Grand Prix tournament

BWF International Challenge/Series (4 titles, 2 runners-up) 
Men's singles

  BWF International Challenge tournament
  BWF International Series tournament

References

External links 
 

1994 births
Living people
Hong Kong male badminton players
Badminton players at the 2016 Summer Olympics
Badminton players at the 2020 Summer Olympics
Olympic badminton players of Hong Kong
Badminton players at the 2014 Asian Games
Badminton players at the 2018 Asian Games
Asian Games competitors for Hong Kong
21st-century Hong Kong people